Xanthooestrus is a genus of flies in the family Tachinidae.

Species
 Xanthooestrus fastuosus Villeneuve, 1914
 Xanthooestrus formosus Townsend, 1931

References

Tachinidae genera